Sevdalinka, also known as Sevdah music,  is a traditional genre of folk music originating from Bosnia and Herzegovina. In Bosnia and Herzegovina, Sevdalinka is an integral part of the Bosniak culture, but is also spread across the ex-Yugoslavia region, including Croatia, Montenegro, North Macedonia and Serbia.  The actual composers of many Sevdalinka songs are largely unknown because these are traditional folk songs.

In a musical sense, Sevdalinka is characterized by a slow or moderate tempo and intense, emotional melodies. Sevdalinka songs are very elaborate, emotionally charged and are traditionally sung with passion and fervor. The combination of Oriental, European and Sephardic elements make this type of music stand out among other types of folk music from the Balkans. Just like a majority of Balkan folk music, Sevdalinka features very somber, minor-sounding modes, but unlike other types of Balkan folklore music it more intensely features minor second intervals, thus hinting at Oriental makams and the Phrygian mode. As a result, the melodies are noted for leaving a strong melancholic feeling with the listener.

The singer will often impose the rhythm and tempo of the song, both of which can vary throughout the song. Traditionally, Sevdalinka’s are women's songs, most addressing the issue of love and longing, unfulfilled and unfortunate love, some touch on a woman's physical desire for her loved one, and some have various comic elements. There are Sevdah songs written and sung by men as well. Traditionally, they were performed without any instrument, hence their elaborate melody. As with most old folk styles, it is pure assumption what the sound of original melodies were like, as in modern days their interpretations are fully aligned to the Western chromatic system due to instruments used for accompaniment (whereas Oriental modes often use intervals smaller than a semitone). Modern interpretations are followed by a small orchestra featuring the accordion (as the most prominent instrument), the violin, nylon-string guitars and/or other string instruments, occasionally (such as oud, saz or šargija), the flute or clarinet (occasionally), upright bass and the snare drum. In modern interpretations, between the verses, an accordion or violin solo can almost always be heard.

Etymology
The word itself comes from the Turkish sevda which, in turn, derives from Ottoman Turkish sevda refers to a state of being in love, and more specifically to the intense and forlorn longing associated with love-sickness and unrequited love. This is connected with the related Persian word meaning both "melancholic" and "enamored". It was these associations that came with the word when it was brought to Bosnia by the Ottomans. Today it is a richly evocative Bosnian word, meaning pining or a longing (for a loved one, a place, a time) that is both joyous and painful, being the main theme of Sevdalinka lyrics.

Thus the people of Bosnia employ the words "Sevdalinka" and "Sevdah" interchangeably as the name of this music, although the word Sevdah can also be used in other meanings. Saudade, the central term in Portuguese Fado, is of the same origin, likewise emerging from the Arabic language medical discourse used for centuries in both Al-Andalus and the Ottoman empire. N.B., the term melancholy is of similar origin, stemming from original Greek medical term for black bile - melan kholé.

Origins and history
The origins of Sevdalinka are not known for certain, though it is known to date from sometime after the arrival of the Ottomans in the medieval Balkans, but melodies and the venerable "Aman, aman" lyrical figure hint at a Sephardic and Andalusian influence which can be explained by the arrival of Sephardic refugees in Ottoman Bosnia, or more likely an Ottoman Turkish meaning which translates to "have mercy".

The first historically mentioned Sevdalinka is considered to be "Bolest Muje Carevića" (The Illness of Mujo Carević), which is believed to have been written around the year 1475. Another early written document that notes Sevdalinka was from the year 1574 when an Italian man was passing through the Bosnian city of Visoko and heard what he described as "sad songs sung by the locals" that made him feel melancholic. In the early 16th century, a duke from Split mentioned a song about the forbidden love of a Christian girl named Mara Vornić and a Muslim boy named Fadil or Adel/Adil (accounts vary).

The earliest known female Sevdalinka poet was Umihana Čuvidina, who wrote mainly about her dead husband.

Performers
A couple of significant singers of the Sevdalinka in the 1920s, 1930s and 1940s were Rešad Bešlagić and Vuka Šeherović. Towards the end of World War II, Radio Sarajevo was founded and signed some of the most prominent Sevdalije (Sevdalinka performers) among them were Zaim Imamović in 1945, Himzo Polovina in 1953, Beba Selimović in 1954, Safet Isović in 1955 and Zehra Deović in 1960. Nada Mamula was signed to Radio Beograd in 1946. Others like Silvana Armenulić, Emina Zečaj, Nedžad Salković, Hanka Paldum and Meho Puzić were signed to record for such production companies as Jugoton, Diskoton or other Yugoslav labels.

Although sung mainly by traditional Bosniak singers, the Sevdalinka made its way to many "mainstream" musicians. Sevdalinkas were covered by Josipa Lisac, Željko Bebek, Ibrica Jusić, Jadranka Stojaković, Toše Proeski, and Zdravko Čolić.

In 1990s a band Mostar Sevdah Reunion was assembled in Mostar and in early 2000s they became widely popular on the world music scene, receiving high awards for their lively interpretations of Sevdalinkas (that fuse Sevdalinka with contemporary musical styles like jazz, rock and funk) and introducing many people outside Bosnia to the genre of Sevdalinka. Equally popular today is Amira Medunjanin dubbed by music journalist and author Garth Wainwright "Bosnia's Billie Holiday."

Notable songs

Some famous Sevdalinka songs

Il' je vedro, il' oblačno (It's either clear (no clouds in the sky), or clouded)
Ah što ćemo ljubav kriti (Why Should We Hide Our Love)
Da Sam Ptica (If I Were a Bird)
Moj golube (My dove)
Emina
Grana od bora, pala kraj mora (A Branch of Pine, Fell by the Sea)
Karanfile Cvijeće Moje (Carnation, My Flower)
Kraj potoka bistre vode (By a Stream of Crystal Clear Water)
Omer-beže na kuli sjeđaše (Bey Omer Sits on the Tower)
Razbolje se lijepa Hajrija (Beautiful Hajrija Became Ill)
Razbolje se Sultan Sulejman (The Sultan Suleiman Became Ill)
Sejdefu majka buđaše (Sejdefa's Mother Wakes Her)
Snijeg pade na behar na voće (Snow Fell on the Blossom, on the Fruit)
Što te nema (Why Aren't You Here)
Sve behara i sve cvjeta (Everything Blossoms and Everything Blooms)
Tekla rijeka potokom i jazom (The River Flowed Through the Stream and Divide)
Teško meni jadnoj u Saraj'vu samoj (It's Difficult for Me, a Poor Girl Alone in Sarajevo)
U Stambolu Na Bosforu (In Istanbul on the Bosphorous)
Zapjevala sojka ptica (The Blue Jay Bird Sang)
Zaplakala šećer Đula (The Sweet Rose Wept)
Zaplakala stara majka (The Elderly Mother Wept)
Zmaj od Bosne (Dragon of Bosnia)
Zvijezda tjera mjeseca (The Star Chases the Moon)

Other Bosnian folk songs often mentioned as Sevdalinka-s
Crven Fesić (Little Red Fez)
Čudna jada od Mostara grada (Strange Wretch from the Town of Mostar)
Djevojka sokolu zulum učinila (The Girl Perpetrated Cruelty on the Falcon)
Došla voda od brijega do brijega (The Water Came from Hill to Hill)
Karanfil se na put sprema (Karanfil Prepares for a Journey)
Ko se ono brijegom šeće? (Who Is Walking on the Hill?)
Lijepi li su Mostarski dućani (Mostar's Shops Are Beautiful)
Mila majko, šalji me na vodu (Dear Mother, Send Me to the Water)
Moj dilbere (My Darling)
Mujo kuje konja po mjesecu (Mujo Shoes the Horse in the Moonlight)
Sinoć ja i moja kona (Last Night, My Neighbor and I)
Tamburalo momče uz tamburu (The Boy Played the Tamburica)
U lijepom starom gradu  Višegradu (In the Beautiful Old Town of Višegrad)
Vino piju Age Sarajlije (The Aghas of Sarajevo Drink Wine)

Examples
Anadolka 
Kad ja pođoh  (Guitar)  (Flute)
Ne Klepeći Nanulama 
Što te nema (Hasanagin Sevdah) 
U Stambolu na Bosforu
Žute Dunje

References

External links
 Sevdalinka.info
 Sevdalinkas.com Sevdalinkas Archive
 Sevdalinke.com Digital Archive
 Radio Sevdah
 Story: Sevdalinke - part-1 - balkanist.net

 
Bosniak culture
Bosniak history
Bosnia and Herzegovina music history
Bosnia and Herzegovina folk music
Bosnia and Herzegovina culture
Bosnia and Herzegovina music
World music genres
Turkish words and phrases
Folk music genres